Baetis notos is a species of small minnow mayfly in the family Baetidae. It is found in Central America, North America. In North America its range includes southern Mexico, the southern, and northwestern United States.

References

Further reading

 

Mayflies
Articles created by Qbugbot
Insects described in 1987